Ceranemota partida is a moth in the family Drepanidae. It was described by John Frederick Gates Clarke in 1938. It is found in North America, where it has been recorded from northern Colorado.

The wingspan is 36–41 mm. Adults are inseparable from Ceranemota tearlei in external characters but may be distinguished by characters of the genitalia. Adults have been recorded on wing in July, September and October.

References

Moths described in 1938
Thyatirinae